Ampana is a town and the administrative centre of the Tojo Una-Una Regency, in Central Sulawesi Province of Indonesia. Ampana is located in the middle between Poso and Luwuk.

Transportation 
The city is served by the Tanjung Api Airport .

Climate
Ampana has a tropical rainforest climate (Af) with moderate rainfall in December and January and heavy rainfall in the remaining months.

References

Populated places in Central Sulawesi
Regency seats of Central Sulawesi